Statistics of SEGAS Championship in the 1909–10 season.

Overview
Goudi Athens won the championship.

References
rsssf

 

Panhellenic Championship seasons
Greece
1909–10 in Greek football